Hawthorn tram depot was built in April 1916 by the Hawthorn Tramways Trust (HTT). It was built on the corner of Power Street and Wallen Road, Hawthorn, a suburb of Melbourne, Australia. The depot was close to the junction of the HTT's two main lines. It was taken over by the Melbourne & Metropolitan Tramways Board (MMTB) in 1920. In 1925 the depot was used as a school to teach tram drivers and tram conductors. In 1940, the building was also used to make uniforms for MMTB staff.

The depot closed as a running depot on 13 February 1965, but was kept in use for training and uniform manufacture until the 1990s.

In August 1998, Transport Minister Robin Cooper announced the site would be redeveloped as a residential complex by the Urban Land Corporation, with part of the depot to be retained as a museum. The museum was opened by Transport Minister Peter Batchelor on 19 January 2003.

In 1996 the depot was added to the Victorian Heritage Register.

Friends of Hawthorn Tram Depot
The tram museum is owned by VicTrack, but the museum is staffed and run by the Friends of Hawthorn Tram Depot. This group is a volunteer, non-profit group set up to preserve the history of Melbourne's trams. The museum has 17 fully restored trams. The collection also includes one of Melbourne's original cable trams.

The Bellcord is the in house publication of the Friends of Hawthorn Tram Depot. It is published quarterly.

References

External links

Heritage-listed buildings in Melbourne
Museums in Melbourne
Tram depots in Melbourne
Tram museums
Transport infrastructure completed in 1916
1916 establishments in Australia
1965 disestablishments in Australia
Buildings and structures in the City of Boroondara